Ylodes is a genus of caddisflies, belonging to the family Leptoceridae.

The genus was described in 1934 by Milne.

Species:
 Ylodes albicornis (Ulmer, 1905)
 Ylodes calcaratus (Martynov, 1928)
 Ylodes canus (Navas, 1933)
 Ylodes conspersus (Rambur, 1842)
 Ylodes detruncatus (Martynov, 1924)
 Ylodes frontalis (Banks, 1907)
 Ylodes internus (McLachlan, 1875)
 Ylodes jakutanus (Martynov, 1910)
 Ylodes kawraiskii (Martynov, 1909)
 Ylodes levanidovae Morse & Vshivkova, 1997
 Ylodes reuteri (McLachlan, 1880)
 Ylodes schmidi Manuel & Nimmo, 1984
 Ylodes simulans (Tjeder, 1929)
 Ylodes zarudnyi (Martynov, 1928)

References

Trichoptera
Trichoptera genera